Lee Seung-yun (born 18 April 1995) is a South Korean archer. After winning medals at the World Youth Championships, he was first selected for the South Korean archery team in 2013, in which year he won team and individual medals at the 2013 Archery World Cup, finishing 4th in the World Cup Final in Paris, and reached the final of the 2013 World Archery Championships where he defeated teammate and Olympic champion Oh Jin-hyek. He reached a career high world ranking of 5 in 2013, and in 2016 he ranked 8th.

Lee, in his first international season, never finished out of the top eight in competition. As well as his world title, he qualified for the World Cup Final courtesy of an individual gold medal at the fourth World Cup stage of the year in Wroclaw.

During the 2016 Summer Olympics, he won gold as part of the South Korean team, and qualified for the men's individual round.

References

External links
 
 

South Korean male archers
Living people
1995 births
Asian Games medalists in archery
Archers at the 2014 Asian Games
World Archery Championships medalists
Asian Games bronze medalists for South Korea
Archers at the 2016 Summer Olympics
Olympic archers of South Korea
Medalists at the 2016 Summer Olympics
Olympic gold medalists for South Korea
Olympic medalists in archery
Medalists at the 2014 Asian Games
Universiade medalists in archery
Universiade gold medalists for South Korea
South Korean Buddhists
Medalists at the 2015 Summer Universiade
Medalists at the 2017 Summer Universiade
Sportspeople from Incheon
21st-century South Korean people